The Golden Bell Award for Best Newcomer in a Television Series is one of the categories of the competition for the Taiwanese television production, Golden Bell Awards. It was first presented by the Government Information Office in 1980, and was discontinued from 1985 to 2014. The category resumed in 2015 and has since been presented annually by the Bureau of Audiovisual and Music Industry Development.

Winners and nominees

1980s

2010s

2020s

References

Newcomer in a Television Series, Best
Golden Bell Awards, Best Newcomer in a Television Series